James Robert Thompson Jr. (May 8, 1936 – August 14, 2020) was an American attorney and politician who served as the 37th governor of Illinois from 1977 to 1991. A moderate Republican who sometimes took more liberal stances on issues, he was Illinois's longest-serving governor, having been elected to four consecutive terms and holding the office for 14 years. In later years, Thompson served as a member of the National Commission on Terrorist Attacks Upon the United States (the 9/11 Commission).

Early life and career
Thompson was born in Chicago, Illinois, the son of Agnes Josephine (Swanson) and James Robert Thompson, a physician. His maternal grandparents were Swedish, and his father was descended from colonial Massachusetts governor David Thompson through an entirely paternal line. Through his father's father he is also descended from Josiah Winslow, John Winthrop the Younger, John Leverett, John Underhill and John Mason. His father's mother had ancestors who were Presbyterians of Scottish descent from Carrickfergus, Ballymena and Coleraine, County Antrim, Ireland in what has since become Northern Ireland. Thompson graduated from North Park Academy (now North Park University), studied at the University of Illinois at Chicago Navy Pier campus, and at Washington University in St. Louis. He received his J.D. from Northwestern University in 1959.

Prior to becoming governor, he worked in the Cook County State's Attorney's office, taught at Northwestern University's law school and was appointed by President Nixon to serve as U.S. Attorney for the Northern District of Illinois. As a federal prosecutor in the early 1970s, he obtained a conviction against former Governor Otto Kerner, Jr. for his use of improper influence on behalf of the racetrack industry.

He tried and convicted many of Chicago Mayor Richard J. Daley's top aides, most notably Alderman Thomas E. Keane and County Clerk Matt Danaher, on various corruption charges. People like Keane and Danaher, the mayor's point man on patronage were also major figures in the Cook County Democratic Party's political machine. These high-profile cases gave Thompson the celebrity that fueled his run for governor in 1976.

To the chagrin of many, Thompson was bipartisan in his attacks on corruption in Cook County and Chicago. He not only prosecuted high-profile Democrats, but also prominent Republicans such as County Commissioner Floyd Fulle and former U.S. Senate candidate, William Rentschler. Organized crime in Chicago was harder for his unit to crack and there were few high-profile cases during his era.

Governor of Illinois

Elections

1976 election 
In the 1976 election, he won 65 percent of the vote over Democratic Secretary of State Michael Howlett, who had defeated incumbent Governor Dan Walker in the primary and who had the support of Chicago Mayor and Cook County Democratic Party chairman Richard J. Daley. Thompson was the first candidate for governor to receive over 3 million votes; his tally of 3,000,395 remains the largest number of votes ever cast for a candidate in an election for Governor of Illinois. His first term was for only two years because Illinois moved its gubernatorial election from presidential-election years to midterm-election years.

1978 and 1982 elections 

Thompson was re-elected to a full four-year term in 1978 with 60 percent of the vote, defeating State Comptroller Michael Bakalis. In 1982, Thompson was very narrowly re-elected over former U.S. Senator Adlai E. Stevenson III.  Thompson won the contest by only 5,074 votes.

1986 election 
A rematch in 1986 was expected to be almost as close, but the Democrats were severely hamstrung when supporters of Lyndon LaRouche won the Democratic nominations for lieutenant governor and secretary of state. Stevenson refused to appear on the same ticket as the LaRouchites, and formed the Solidarity Party with the support of the regular state Democratic organization.  
With the Democrats badly split, Thompson skated to victory in the general election.  Thompson was accused of hiding the sad shape that Illinois' economy and budget were in while campaigning, but once elected, called for an emergency session of the Illinois legislature to address the crisis.

Tenure 

On November 12, 1980, Thompson, by his executive order, instituted a hiring freeze for all state agencies, boards, bureaus, and commissions under his control as governor. The order affected approximately 60,000 state positions.

These positions could only be filled if the candidates were first approved by an office created by Thompson, the Governor's Office of Personnel. Suit was brought and the Supreme Court held this political patronage practice unconstitutional as a violation of the First Amendment rights of low-level public employees in Rutan v. Republican Party of Illinois, 497 U.S. 62 (1990).

In 1989, Governor Thompson agreed to establish a compounding, 3 percent cost-of-living increase for retirees from Illinois government jobs, including public school teachers. Years later, in an interview with a Chicago business magazine, Thompson said he never knew the cost might exceed $1 billion and likely would not have signed it if he had known.
In recent years, the cumulative effect of the 3 percent annual increases has been recognized as one of the major causes of Illinois' public employee pension crisis.

In 1993, the State of Illinois Center in Chicago was renamed the James R. Thompson Center to honor the former governor.

Presidential speculations 
During his tenure, Thompson was mentioned as a potential future candidate for President or Vice President. In 1978, The Washington Post declared that "[d]uring his first year of elective office, Gov. James R. Thompson has passed one test of a viable presidential candidate to oppose Jimmy Carter" in 1980. Thompson did not run, but was reportedly considered as a running mate for Republican nominee Ronald Reagan. A Chicago Tribune report in 1988 concluded that Thompson was very interested in serving as President, but felt that it was too soon for him to run in 1980 and unviable to run against Vice President George H. W. Bush in 1988.

Legal and lobbying career
After leaving public service, Thompson joined Winston & Strawn, a major Chicago-based law firm. Thompson served as chairman of the executive committee from 1991 to 2006, as well as chairman and CEO of the firm from 1993 to 2006. He was senior chairman until January 31, 2015.

As CEO of Winston & Strawn, he focused in the area of government relations and regulatory affairs. The firm has lobbied for American Airlines, and he  previously represented United Airlines.

Winston & Strawn is the same firm that represented former Illinois governor George Ryan pro bono against federal charges relating to the "Licenses-for-Bribes" scandal during Ryan's tenure as Illinois Governor and Secretary of State. Thompson acted as Ryan's lawyer personally.

On April 17, 2006, Ryan was convicted on all 18 counts, which included racketeering, misusing state resources for political gain, and fraud. He was sentenced to 6½ years in federal prison and began serving his sentence on November 7, 2007. Ryan was released from federal prison on July 3, 2013.

Thompson was also a director and head of the Audit Committee for Hollinger International, the media company founded by Conrad Black, which was the subject of a U.S. Securities and Exchange Commission investigation.

Post-gubernatorial political activities
In 2002, he was appointed to serve on the 9/11 Commission, where he aggressively questioned Richard Clarke, the former chief counter-terrorism adviser on the United States National Security Council. The report of the commission was released on July 22, 2004.

During the 2008 presidential primary campaign, Thompson announced his support for former New York City mayor Rudy Giuliani for the 2008 Republican nomination. He stressed that Giuliani was the only Republican in the field who could win Illinois.

Death
After suffering heart issues, Thompson died on August 14, 2020, at the age of 84. In a tribute on Twitter, political consultant David Axelrod, who covered Thompson as a young journalist, described him as "one of the smartest and most formidable politicians I’ve ever known.”

Awards
James R. Thompson was inducted as a laureate of The Lincoln Academy of Illinois and awarded the Order of Lincoln (the state's highest honor) by the governor of Illinois in 1991 in the area of Government.

References

External links

Thompson's biography from the 9/11 Commission
Thompson's biography from Northwestern University
Receipt for Thompson's contribution for Friends of Hillary
National Governors Association

Sources
 

|-

|-

|-

|-

1936 births
2020 deaths
American people of Swedish descent
Republican Party governors of Illinois
Lawyers from Chicago
North Park University alumni
Northwestern University Pritzker School of Law alumni
Northwestern University Pritzker School of Law faculty
Politicians from Chicago
United States Attorneys for the Northern District of Illinois
University of Illinois Chicago alumni
Washington University in St. Louis alumni
People associated with Winston & Strawn
Fellows of the American Physical Society